John Henry Poynting FRS (9 September 185230 March 1914) was an English physicist. He was the first professor of physics at Mason Science College from 1880 to 1900, and then the successor institution, the University of Birmingham until his death.

Biography
Poynting was the youngest son of Thomas Elford Poynting, a Unitarian minister. He was born at the parsonage of the Monton Unitarian Chapel in Eccles, Lancashire (his father serving as minister there from 1846 to 1878.) In his boyhood he was educated at the nearby school operated by his father. From 1867 to 1872 he attended Owens College, now the University of Manchester, where his physics teachers included Osborne Reynolds and Balfour Stewart. From 1872 to 1876 he was a student at Cambridge University, where he attained high honours in mathematics after taking grinds with Edward Routh. In the late 1870s he worked in the Cavendish Laboratory at Cambridge under James Clerk Maxwell. In 1880, he became the first professor of physics at the University of Birmingham.

He was the developer and eponym of the Poynting vector, which describes the direction and magnitude of electromagnetic energy flow and is used in the Poynting theorem, a statement about energy conservation for electric and magnetic fields. This work was first published in 1884. He performed a measurement of Newton's gravitational constant by innovative means during 1893. In 1903 he was the first to realise that the Sun's radiation can draw in small particles towards it: this was later named the Poynting–Robertson effect.

He discovered the torsion-extension coupling in finite strain elasticity. This is now known as the (positive) Poynting effect in torsion.

Poynting and the Nobel prizewinner J. J. Thomson co-authored a multi-volume undergraduate physics textbook, which was in print for about 50 years and was in widespread use during the first third of the 20th century. Poynting wrote most of it.

He was awarded an honorary MSc in Pure Science in 1901 by Birmingham University.

Poynting lived at 11 St Augustine's Road, Edgbaston with his family and servants for some years.  He previously lived at 66 Beaufort Road, Edgbaston (demolished) and died of a diabetic coma, aged 61, at 10 Ampton Road, Edgbaston in 1914. In 1880 he married Maria Adney Cropper. He was survived by his widow, a son, and two daughters.

Legacy
Alfred J. Lotka was among Poynting's most famous students, being inspired by Poynting to apply the ideas of physical chemistry to biology. Lotka dedicated his classic book on mathematical population biology to Poynting.
Poynting predicted the `Poynting-Robertson effect', whereby a particle of dust orbiting a star experiences a drag force which makes it spiral slowly into the star.  Howard P. Robertson later restated the prediction using General Relativity.
Poynting also founded and is the namesake of the popular student society at the University of Birmingham, 'The Poynting Physical Society' or PPS.

Craters on Mars and the Moon are named in his honour, as is the main Physics building at the University of Birmingham and the departmental society there, the Poynting Physical Society.
He is credited with coining the expression "greenhouse effect" in 1909 to explain how infrared-absorbing trace gasses such as carbon dioxide in the atmosphere increases the surface temperature of Earth and Mars.

Works by J. H. Poynting 

 1884 A Comparison of the Fluctuations in the Price of Wheat and in the Cotton and Silk Imports into Great Britain, Journal of the Royal Statistical Society; 47, 1884, pp. 34–64
 1894 The Mean Density of the Earth London, C. Griffin
 1899 (with J. J. Thomson) A Text-Book of Physics: volume I: Sound London, C. Griffin; 2nd edition, 1900 
 1902 (with J. J. Thomson) A Text-Book of Physics: volume II: Properties of Matter London, C. Griffin
 1904 (with J. J. Thomson) A Text-Book of Physics: volume III: Heat London, C. Griffin
 1913 The earth; its shape, size, weight and spin Cambridge University Press
 1914 (with J. J. Thomson) A Text-Book of Physics: volume IV: Electricity and Magnetism. Pts. I and II: Static electricity and magnetism London, C. Griffin
 1920 Collected Scientific Papers Cambridge University Press

References

External links
 
 
 

1852 births
1914 deaths
English physicists
Academics of the University of Birmingham
Royal Medal winners
Fellows of the Royal Society
Presidents of the Physical Society